Robert Moorhouse "Bobby" Coleman III (born May 5, 1997) is an American actor.  He is best known for his roles as a child actor in the films Martian Child (2007), as the title character, and The Last Song (2010).

Life and career
Robert Coleman was born in Los Angeles, California, the son of Doris Berg and Robert Moorhouse Coleman Jr. He is the younger brother of actress Holliston Coleman, and lives with his family in the Los Angeles area.

Coleman began acting at the age of five in commercials, and has since appeared in several film and television productions. He had brief appearances in a number of series such as Medium and JAG, before moving into film roles. He appeared in the feature films Must Love Dogs and Friends with Money, and also had a recurring role in the television series Surface, before taking leading roles in the films Glass House: The Good Mother and Take. He played the title lead role in the film Martian Child, his second role alongside John Cusack and is set to appear with his sister in Proving Ground: From the Adventures of Captain Redlocks, in which he will play the younger brother of his real-life sister. They are both set to star together again in the science-fiction adventure film, Robosapien: Rebooted. He appeared in the 2010 film The Last Song as Jonah Miller, the younger brother of Miley Cyrus's character.

Filmography

Awards
 2008 Young Artist Award
 Best Performance in a Feature Film - Young Actor Age Ten or Younger for Martian Child — Nominated

References

External links

1997 births
American male child actors
American male film actors
American male television actors
Living people
Male actors from Los Angeles